Albertus Johannes "Bert" van Manen (born 24 March 1965) is an Australian politician who has been a member of the House of Representatives since the 2010 federal election, representing the Division of Forde. He is a member of the Liberal National Party of Queensland and sits with the Liberal Party in federal parliament. He has been the party's chief whip in the House of Representatives since July 2019.

Early life 
Bert Van Manen was born in Brisbane, Queensland, to Dutch immigrants. His father was a ceramic tiler. His family moved to Waterford when he was young. He was educated at Kingston, Waterford and Waterford West primary schools and at Kingston State High.

In 1987 he married Judi, and they have two sons.

Bert Van Manen was employed as a bank officer for 15 years, from 1983 to 1998, before running his own business as a financial advisor from 1999 to 2010.

In 2007 Van Manen co-founded Vangrove Financial Planning with Andrew Cosgrove. He resigned as director in April 2012 but retained a 50% ownership; one month later KPMG administrators were called in when the firm collapsed owing creditors $1.5 million.

Van Manen is on the board of the Dunamis International College of  Bible Ministries, revealed in his maiden speech.

Political career 
In 2007, Bert Van Manen was the Family First Party candidate in the seat of Rankin. He received 3.53% of the primary vote in that election.

In the 2010 federal election, van Manen won the Division of Forde from the Australian Labor Party (ALP) incumbent Brett Raguse. He retained his seat at the 2013 federal election, 2016 federal election,  2019 federal elections, and the 2022 Australian federal election.

In August 2016 he was appointed to the position of Government Whip. He has served as a Member of the Joint Statutory Committee on Law Enforcement; Joint Standing Committee on Law Enforcement; House of Representatives Standing Committee on Law Enforcement and House of Representatives Select Committee on Law Enforcement.

He was endorsed by the evangelical Christian Dunamis Church, which provided church volunteers to aid his election campaign with "booth work, letterbox drops and many other things."

In 2017, the Division of Forde voted "Yes" in the Australian Marriage Law Postal Survey, with 61% in support of same-sex marriage. Van Manen had campaigned against same-sex marriage, and abstained from the parliamentary vote.

In January 2018, it was reported that several changes to van Manen's Wikipedia page that included deleting references to his failed business, Vangrove Financial Planning, were traced to parliamentary IP addresses. A spokesperson for Bert Van Manen described the edits as having been "well-meaning."

Journalist and former political staffer Niki Savva speculates in her book Plots and Prayers that van Manen may have been a key instrument in the 2018 leadership spill which removed Malcolm Turnbull as Prime Minister, as Van Manen was deputy Whip and a part of the Morrison Bible Group. Van Manen's was one of six crucial votes that determined Scott Morrison to be the new leader.

On 2 July 2019, following the 2019 federal election, van Manen replaced Nola Marino as Chief Government Whip in the House of Representatives.

Van Manen is a member of the centre-right faction of the Liberal Party.

Electoral History

External links
Bert van Manen MP official website
Search or browse Hansard for Bert van Manen at OpenAustralia.org

References

1965 births
Living people
Liberal National Party of Queensland members of the Parliament of Australia
Members of the Australian House of Representatives
Members of the Australian House of Representatives for Forde
Family First Party politicians
Australian people of Dutch descent
Politicians from Brisbane
21st-century Australian politicians
Liberal Party of Australia members of the Parliament of Australia